Harriet Calista Clark McCabe (1827 - September 25, 1919) was a philanthropist, a pioneer in women's work for temperance and missions.

Early life
Harriet Calista Clark McCabe was born in Sidney Plains, Delaware County, New York. Her parents were devout members of the Methodist Church. McCabe was reared on a farm. Until the age of twelve she was educated either in the district school or by private governess.

She became a fluent French scholar before she was ten years of age, and delighted in the scientific study of plants. When she was twelve years of age, her parents moved to Elmira, New York, where she passed several years in school.

Career

She taught seven years in Dickinson Seminary, Williamsport, Pennsylvania.

At the age of twenty, she converted and became a Catholic. She engaged in the various women's societies in the church since that time. In April 1874, she wrote the constitution of the Woman's Christian Temperance Union of Ohio, which was the first union organized. That constitution was accepted by the organizing committee, which represented the State and which proposed the name, "Woman's Christian Temperance Union." The State convention met in June in Springfield, Ohio, and ratified the convention and accepted the name. The convention was held in the Evangelical Lutheran Church of Springfield, but the William Street Methodist Episcopal Church, Delaware, Ohio, claims the honor of having the organizing work done and the name of the great organization given within its walls. The National Union, organized in the fall following in Cleveland, Ohio, accepted the constitution of the Ohio union, with the requisite modifications. It also accepted the name.

After serving the Ohio union for five years, she withdrew to enjoy her home and respite from public assemblies, to which she was not inclined. After some time she yielded to earnest persuasion to aid in the National Woman's Indian Association, and then in the Woman's Home Missionary Society of her own church. She edited the Woman's Home Missions, the official organ of that society, was one of its vice-presidents, and also secretary of its Indian bureau.

Personal life
She married Lorenzo Dow McCabe (1817-1897), professor of mathematics and afterwards of philosophy in the Ohio Wesleyan University, Delaware, Ohio. She had at least three children: John Jay McCabe (1859-1933), Robert Lorenzo McCabe (1863-1937) and Calista McCabe Courtenay (1868-1936).

She died on September 25, 1919, and is buried at Oak Grove Cemetery, Delaware, Ohio.

References

People from Delaware County, New York
Philanthropists from New York (state)
1827 births
1919 deaths
Wikipedia articles incorporating text from A Woman of the Century
19th-century American philanthropists